The 2018–19 Brunei FA Cup (also known as the DST FA Cup for sponsorship reasons) is the 12th edition of the Brunei FA Cup, the knockout football tournament in Brunei.

Round of 16

|-
!colspan=3|6 March 2019

|-
!colspan=3|12 March 2019

|-
!colspan=3|13 March 2019

|-
!colspan=3|16 March 2019

|-
!colspan=3|20 March 2019

|-
!colspan=3|29 March 2019

|-
!colspan=3|30 March 2019

|}

Quarter-finals

|-
!colspan=3|5 April 2019

|-
!colspan=3|6 April 2019

|-
!colspan=3|13 April 2019

|}

Semi-finals

|-
!colspan=3|17 April 2019

|-
!colspan=3|19 April 2019

|}

Final

|-
!colspan=3|22 April 2019

|}

See also
2018–19 Brunei Super League

References

External links
National Football Association of Brunei Darussalam - NFABD Facebook page

Football competitions in Brunei
Brunei
FA Cup
FA Cup